Career Opportunities may refer to:

 "Career Opportunities" (song), a 1977 song by The Clash
 Career Opportunities (film), a 1991 American romantic comedy film